The 2013 Ivy League men's lacrosse tournament took place May 3 to May 5 at Schoellkopf Field in  Ithaca, New York. The winner of the tournament received the Ivy League 's automatic bid to the 2013 NCAA Division I Men's Lacrosse Championship. Four teams from the Ivy League conference competed in the single elimination tournament. The seeds were based upon the teams' regular season conference record.

Standings
Only the top four teams in the Ivy League conference advanced to the Ivy League Conference Tournament.

Schedule

Bracket
Schoellkopf Field - Ithaca, New York

 denotes an overtime game

References
https://web.archive.org/web/20150518094923/http://www.ivyleaguesports.com/championships/mlax/2012-13/championship_info Retrieved 2015-05-08.

https://web.archive.org/web/20150518094930/http://www.ivyleaguesports.com/sports/mlax/2012-13/schedule Retrieved 2015-05-08.

https://web.archive.org/web/20150518094917/http://www.ivyleaguesports.com/sports/mlax/2012-13/standings Retrieved 2015-05-08.

https://web.archive.org/web/20150428041251/http://www.ivyleaguesports.com/sports/mlax/index Retrieved 2015-05-08.

2013 in lacrosse